The Mission League is a high school athletic league that is part of the CIF Southern Section.

Member schools
Bishop Alemany High School (Mission Hills)
Chaminade College Preparatory (West Hills)
Crespi Carmelite High School (Encino)
Harvard-Westlake School (Studio City)
Loyola High School (Los Angeles)
Notre Dame High School (Sherman Oaks)
St. Francis High School (La Cañada)

Football membership
Bishop Alemany High School (Mission Hills)
Bishop Amat Memorial High School (La Puente)
Chaminade College Preparatory (West Hills)
Junipero Serra High School (Gardena)
Notre Dame High School (Sherman Oaks)

References

CIF Southern Section leagues